Bindhyavasini Devi (died 2006) was an Indian folk musician. She was popularly recognised as Bihar Kokila. She was the founder of Vindhya Kala Mandir, a Patna based music academy promoting folk music, Vindhya Kala Mandir. The academy is associated with Bhatkhande University, Lucknow for 55 years now which is now run by her daughter-in-law Shobha Sinha, son Sudhir Kumar Sinha. She was born in Muzzafarpur in the Indian state of Bihar and specialised in Maithili, Bhojpuri and Magahi folk music. She also sang a popular song, Chhote Dulha Ke, in a movie, Vivah Geet and many of her songs have been released in CD format.

The Government of India awarded her the fourth highest Indian civilian award of Padma Shri in 1974. The Sangeet Natak Akademi awarded her their annual award in 1991 and followed it up with Akademi Fellowship in 2006. She received the Ahilya Bai Award from the Government of Madhya Pradesh in 1998. Bindhyavasini Devi died at her Kankarbagh residence on 18 April 2006 at the age of 86, survived by her two sons and a daughter.

See also

 Indian folk music

References

External links
 
 

Recipients of the Padma Shri in arts
Year of birth missing
2006 deaths
People from Muzaffarpur
Singers from Bihar
Indian women folk singers
Indian folk singers
Recipients of the Sangeet Natak Akademi Award
Recipients of the Sangeet Natak Akademi Fellowship
Indian women playback singers
20th-century Indian singers
20th-century Indian women singers
Women musicians from Bihar